Catton may refer to:

Places

England
 Catton, Derbyshire
 Catton, East Riding of Yorkshire
 Catton Grove Chalk Pit, Site of Special Scientific Interest (SSSI) in Norfolk
 Catton Hall, Country house in Derbyshire, England
 Catton, North Yorkshire
 Catton, Northumberland
 Catton Hall, Derbyshire
 Catton, Norfolk, Norfolk:
 Old Catton, Norfolk
 New Catton, Norfolk; a UK location
 Catton Park, Old Catton, Norwich, public park in Old Catton
 High Catton, village in Yorkshire
 Low Catton, village in Yorkshire

United States
 Catton, the original estate on the site of Belair Mansion, Collington, Maryland

People with the surname
 Charles Catton the elder (1728–1798), English artist
 Charles Catton the younger (1756–1819), English artist 
 Bruce Catton, (1899–1978) an American writer & journalist
 Jack J. Catton (1920–1990), American air-force General
 William R. Catton, Jr. (1926–2015), American environmental sociologist and human ecologist
 Rich Catton (born 1971), Canadian Lacrosse player
 Eleanor Catton (born 1985), New Zealand author